Rasim Başak (born Ruslan Avleev on 17 February 1980) is a retired Azerbaijani-Turkish professional basketball player. The power forward is 2.02 m tall and 100 kg weight and wears numbers 8. He has Russian mother and Azeri father but also has Turkish citizenship and he already played several times for the Turkish national team. He will play for Azerbaijan national basketball team after TBF's permit.

Career highlights
 1998 Turkish Youth Championship with Oyak Renault
 Second place of Turkish 2nd Basketball League with Oyak Renault
 2004–05 FIBA Europe League Final Four with Fenerbahçe
 2007, 2008, 2010 Turkish Basketball League Champions with Fenerbahçe
 2007 Turkish President's Cup Champion with Fenerbahçe

International career
He played for Turkish national team in EuroBasket 2003 and started to play for Azerbaijan national team since July 2010.

External links
TBLStat.net Profile
TurkSports.Net Profile
Player profile on fenerbahce.org
Player profile on euroleague.net

References

1980 births
Living people
Sportspeople from Baku
Russian men's basketball players
Turkish men's basketball players
Turkish people of Azerbaijani descent
Antalya Büyükşehir Belediyesi players
Azerbaijani men's basketball players
Azerbaijani emigrants to Turkey
Azerbaijani expatriate basketball people in Turkey
Russian expatriate basketball people in Turkey
Fenerbahçe men's basketball players
Oyak Renault basketball players
Türk Telekom B.K. players
Power forwards (basketball)
Small forwards